Onocephala suturalis is a species of beetle in the family Cerambycidae. It was discovered by Henry Walter Bates in 1887. It is native to Brazil.

References

Onciderini
Beetles described in 1887